Alice Adams is a 1923 silent film drama directed by Rowland V. Lee and starring Florence Vidor. It was produced by King Vidor. It is based on the 1921 novel Alice Adams by Booth Tarkington, later made into a 1935 sound film.

Cast
Florence Vidor as Alice Adams
Claude Gillingwater as Virgil Adams
Harold Goodwin as Walter Adorns
Margaret McWade as Mrs. Adams
Tom Ricketts as J. A. Lamb
Margaret Landis as Henrietta Lamb
Gertrude Astor as Mildred Palmer
Vernon Steele as Arthur Russell

Preservation status
A fragment is preserved in the BFI National Film & Television Archive.

References

External links
 Alice Adams at IMDb.com

1923 films
American silent feature films
Films directed by Rowland V. Lee
Lost American films
Films based on American novels
Films based on works by Booth Tarkington
American black-and-white films
Silent American drama films
1923 drama films
1923 lost films
Lost drama films
Associated Exhibitors films
1920s American films
English-language drama films